Snoop Dogg has appeared in various video games, music videos, television series, and film appearances such as the Academy Award-winning drama Training Day and the critically acclaimed cable television series The L Word. He also has appeared in documentaries on Hip hop music and other subjects, and is the subject of a 2012 documentary, Reincarnated, on his transformation into "Snoop Lion", a reggae artist.

Film

Television appearances

Biographical portrayals in film

Video games

Guest appearances

Music videos

As lead artist

Cameo appearances 
 Big Pun's Deep Cover '98 as himself.
 DJ Quik's You'z A Ganxta as himself.
 Mariah Carey's Heartbreaker (remix) as himself.
 Limp Bizkit's Break Stuff as himself.
 Kurupt's It's Over as himself.
 Sean Combs's Bad Boy For Life as himself.
 Britney Spears' Outrageous as himself.
 Lil Scrappy's No Problem as himself.
 Korn's Twisted Transistor as Munky.
 Flo Rida's Good Feeling as himself.
 R. Kelly's Backyard Party as himself.
 Usher's Don't Waste My Time as himself.

References 

Male actor filmographies
Snoop Dogg
American filmographies